Tamara Elizabeth "Tammy" Jernigan (born May 7, 1959) is an American astrophysicist and former NASA astronaut. During her career she completed five Space Shuttle program missions (three on Columbia and one each on Endeavour and Discovery), logging over 1512 hours in space. Jernigan left NASA in 2001 and currently serves as Deputy Principal Associate Director in the Weapons and Complex Integration (WCI) organization at Lawrence Livermore National Laboratory.

Early life and education
Tamara Elizabeth Jernigan was born on May 7, 1959, in Chattanooga, Tennessee, to Mary and Terry Jernigan. She attended Santa Fe High School in Santa Fe Springs, California, graduating in 1977.  Jernigan attended Stanford University, where she played varsity volleyball. She earned a B.S. degree in physics in 1981 and an M.S. in engineering science in 1983. At the University of California, Berkeley, she received an M.S. in astronomy in 1985. In 1988, she was awarded a Ph.D. in space physics and astronomy from Rice University. Her research focused on the modeling of high-velocity outflows in regions of star formation, gamma-ray bursters, and the study of radiation produced by interstellar shock waves.

NASA career
Jernigan began working for NASA in June 1981 at the Ames Research Center while earning her degrees at Stanford and Berkeley. She worked in the Theoretical Studies Branch as a research scientist until June 1985 when she was among the 13 people selected as astronaut candidates.

She entered the NASA Astronaut Corps in July 1986. Her first trip to space was on June 5, 1991. She flew on five Space Shuttle program missions (three on Columbia and one each on Endeavour and Discovery) and logged over 1512 hours in space. In her last mission on  Discovery in 1999, she performed an extra-vehicular activity for 7 hours and 55.5 minutes.

Jernigan has served as Deputy Chief of the Astronaut Office, assisting with the management of both military and civilian astronauts and support personnel and as Deputy for the Space Station program where she developed and advocated Astronaut Office positions on the design and operation of the International Space Station. She also represented NASA management on the U.S. negotiating team in Moscow during technical interchange meetings designed to resolve crew training, crew rotation, and operational issues.

Jernigan retired from NASA in 2001 and currently serves as Deputy Principal Associate Director in the Weapons and Complex Integration (WCI) organization at Lawrence Livermore National Laboratory.

Awards 
Jernigan is the recipient of the NASA Distinguished Service Medal and the NASA Outstanding Leadership Medal.

Personal
She currently resides in Pleasanton, California. She is married and has a child, Jeffrey Wisoff, with former astronaut Peter Wisoff. They both currently work at the Lawrence Livermore National Laboratory.

References

External links
 NASA Biography

1959 births
Living people
Lawrence Livermore National Laboratory staff
NASA astrophysicists
NASA civilian astronauts
Scientists from Tennessee
Rice University alumni
Space Shuttle program astronauts
Stanford University alumni
University of California, Berkeley alumni
Women astronauts
Women astrophysicists
Spacewalkers